The Forge Mill Needle Museum in Redditch, Worcestershire, is a historic museum depicting Redditch's Industrial Heritage. Opened in 1983 by Queen Elizabeth II, it records how in Victorian times, Redditch was the international centre of the needle and fishing tackle industry and once produced 90% of the world's needles.

Models and recreated scenes provide a vivid illustration of how needles were once made, and the museum organises exhibitions, demonstration, and workshops on how needles were used in  the textile industry.

Forge Mill Museum is open to visitors from February to November. It is near to the ruins of Bordesley Abbey.

External links
 
 Redditch History Website
 Website for the Volunteers at the Museum

Museums in Worcestershire
Museums established in 1983
Redditch
Industry museums in England
1983 establishments in England